This is a list of association football clubs located in Belize. For a complete list, see :Category:Football clubs in Belize

B
Barrio Fino F.C.
Belize Defence Force FC
Belmopan Bandits
Belmopan Blaze
Benque D.C. United
Boca F.C.

C
Costa Del Sol Nairi's

F
FC Belize

G
Georgetown Ibayani
Griga United

I
Ilagulei

J
Juventus (Belize)

K
Kremandala
Kulture Yabra FC

N
New Site Erei
Nizhee Corozal

P
Paradise/Freedom Fighters
Pickstock Lake
Placencia Assassins

R
R.G. City Boys United
Revolutionary Conquerors

S
San Felipe Barcelona
San Ignacio United
San Pedro Seadogs
San Pedro Seahawks
Santel's

T
Texmar United

V
Verdes FC

W
Wagiya
World FC (Belize)

References 
 Belize national league standings

Belize
Football clubs
 
Football clubs